Arielia is a small genus of sea snails, marine gastropod mollusks in the family Mitromorphidae, in the superfamily Conoidea the cone snails and their allies.

Species
 Arielia cancellata Shuto, 1983
 Arielia mitriformis Shasky, 1961

References

External links
 Shasky D.R. (1961). New deep water mollusks from the Gulf of California. The Veliger. 4(1): 18-21, pl. 4
  Bouchet P., Kantor Yu.I., Sysoev A. & Puillandre N. (2011) A new operational classification of the Conoidea. Journal of Molluscan Studies 77: 273-308
 
 Worldwide Mollusc Species Data Base: Mitromorphidae
  Amati B., Smriglio C. & Oliverio M. (2015). Revision of the Recent Mediterranean species of Mitromorpha Carpenter, 1865 (Gastropoda, Conoidea, Mitromorphidae) with the description of seven new species. Zootaxa. 3931(2): 151-195

|

 
Gastropod genera
Mitromorphidae